Actarit is a disease-modifying antirheumatic drug (DMARD) developed in Japan for use in rheumatoid arthritis.

References 

Anti-inflammatory agents
Anilides
Acetamides